People Like Us (PLU) (Chinese:我等之辈) is a gay equality lobby group in Singapore. Having been twice rejected by the government board which approves or prohibits organisations, the Registrar of Societies, it is now in its third incarnation as "PLU3". The term "PLU" has also gradually become slang for "homosexual" amongst members of Singapore's and Malaysia's gay subculture.

According to Joseph Lo, one of the earliest organiser of PLU, PLU aspires to be a space where GLB Singaporeans can "come together to help and support each other," leading the organization to coordinate discussion forums and social events for community building.

History

PLU is an informal association of LGBT (lesbian, gay, bisexual, transgender) and heterosexual allies in Singapore that was formed in 1993.  An initial application to the Registrar of Societies for official recognition of the group was submitted by 10 members, two of whom were heterosexual, on November 7, 1996, and rejected without specification of reason on April 8, 1997.  PLU subsequently submitted an appeal to the Minister for Home Affairs and the Prime Minister, which was rejected in May 1997.  A re-founding meeting in 2003 gathered together over 100 participants, but questions remained about future potentials for recognition and strategy.

Lo, initially at the helm in organising and conducting PLU's activities, gradually took a back seat after Alex Au came on board. Au subsequently became the motive force behind PLU and the identifiable face of gay activism in Singapore, helping to reconstitute PLU in its later incarnations, earning him a gay award from Utopia in 2002.

In 2010 PLU participated in compiling a report on the human rights situation in Singapore to be submitted in advance of the first UN review of human rights in Singapore. PLU also concluded an online survey of LGBT voters in Singapore in 2010 to ascertain issues of political importance to the Singaporean gay community.

Monthly forums 
From 1993 to 1996, PLU held monthly Sunday forums at The Substation. A topic would be chosen and a lead speaker found. But the part which participants enjoyed most was always the break-out sessions. Forum attendees  would divide themselves into smaller groups to flesh out these issues on a more personal and intimate level. Topics varied widely, and included coming out of the closet, the law, insurance for singles, housing and safe sex. More light-hearted ones like "homosexuals and beauty" were also dealt with.

Attendance ranged between 40 and 80 for each forum

See also

LGBT rights in Singapore
List of LGBT rights organisations

Notes

External links
PLU's website

LGBT political advocacy groups in Singapore